Living Direct is a product development and support company for the brands Edgestar, Koldfront, Avallon and Landmark and is and subsidiary of Ferguson plc. The company is headquartered in Austin, Texas.

History 
Living Direct, previously known as Richlund Ventures, was founded in 1999 by entrepreneur Rick Lundbom, who decided to implement his knowledge and previous experience to bring to the market hard-to-find appliances for modern, small-space living. The company started in his home with no outside investors and Lundbom as the sole employee.

Living Direct was an online retail company, specializing in consumer appliances, indoor air quality products, and lawn and garden furniture. Headquartered in Austin, Texas, Living Direct encompassed a network of specialty e-Commerce websites including CompactAppliance.com, LivingDirect.com, PortableAirShop.com, Kegerator.com, SimplyDehumidifiers.com, HotWaterSource.com and WineCoolerDirect.com. The company also designs and manufactures product brands, EdgeStar, Avallon, Landmark and KoldFront.

He began by launching Living Direct's first retail website, CompactAppliance.com. It was followed by PortableAirShop.com in 2004 and HotWaterSource.com in 2007. In 2008, LivingDirect.com was launched. Since then, Kegerator.com, SimplyDehumidifiers.com, WineCoolerDirect.com, IceMakerDirect.com, AirPurifierPro.com, OpenBoxDirect.com and EdgeStar.com were added to the Living Direct network. Living Direct was an e-Commerce enterprise consistently ranked in the Internet Retailer Top 500 Guide of America’s largest e-retailers, as well as a member of the Better Business Bureau.

Entrepreneur Magazine selected Living Direct as a 2007 Hot 500 Fastest Growing Business. In 2008, Living Direct was listed in Inc.com's "5,000 Fastest Growing Private Companies in America," which determines ranking based on revenue growth. 

In October 2015, Living Direct was acquired by Ferguson Enterprises which expanded their customer reach. In 2017 Living Direct shed the retail portion of the company and began to focus solely on product development and support for the Living Direct brands: Edgestar, Koldfront, Landmark and Avallon.

Living Direct Today 
Living Direct began as a niche appliance e-Commerce retailer, in 1999. Now part of Ferguson Enterprises their focus is on manufacturing brands like Edgestar, Avallon, Landmark and Koldfront.

References

Companies based in Austin, Texas
Online retailers of the United States
Retail companies established in 1999
1999 establishments in Texas